Cloghran is a civil parish in the ancient barony of Castleknock in Ireland. According to Lewis' 1837 survey,  The parish consists of three townlands: Ballycoolen, Cloghran and Grange. Most of the land in the parish is taken up with the "Ballycoolen Industrial Estate".

References

From the Placename Database of Ireland
 

Civil parishes of the barony of Castleknock